Dennis Vance (18 March 1924 – 6 October 1983) was a British television producer, director, and occasional actor.

Born in Birkenhead, Cheshire, he began his career as an actor in the late 1940s, appearing in small film parts, such as Poet's Pub, in 1949, before switching to become a producer with BBC Television in the early 1950s. Later, in 1955 he became the first Head of Drama at the ITV contractor ABC Weekend TV, who went on air in 1956, serving the Midlands and the North of England at weekends. He also produced episodes of The Adventures of the Scarlet Pimpernel (1956), also directing a couple of episodes.

At ABC, Vance oversaw the creation of the anthology drama series Armchair Theatre, which was networked nationally across the ITV regions on Sunday evenings. It became an important long running landmark in British television drama series. Vance, however, left the Head of Drama role in 1958 for a promotion within ABC, being replaced by Sydney Newman.

Later in his career he returned to producing and directing work, helming episodes of programmes such as ABC's The Avengers (1961) and Thames' The Rivals of Sherlock Holmes (1971). He also produced and directed The Misfit and The Bass Player and the Blonde for ATV. He also directed episodes of 'Public Eye'.

He had been a Fleet Air Arm pilot during the Second World War, and was married six times with one child from the first three marriages. He died in Wimbledon, London in 1983, at the age of fifty-nine.

Filmography
 Scott of the Antarctic (1948)
 Trouble in the Air (1948)
 Warning to Wantons (1949)
 Poet's Pub (1949)
 Shadow of the Eagle (1950)

References

External links

1924 births
1983 deaths
British television directors
British television producers
20th-century British male actors
People from Birkenhead
20th-century British businesspeople
Fleet Air Arm personnel of World War II
Fleet Air Arm aviators